Neil H. E. Weste (born 1951), is an Australian inventor and engineer, noted for having designed a 2-chip wireless LAN implementation and for authoring the textbook Principles of CMOS VLSI Design. He has worked in many aspects of integrated-circuit design and was a co-founder of Radiata Communications.

Life
Weste grew up in the Riverland Region of South Australia. He received a BSc in Physics in 1974, a BE in 1976, a Ph.D. in 1978, and a Doctor of Engineering (honoris cause) in 2014, all from the University of Adelaide.
Weste worked at a number American technology firms, including Bell Telephone Laboratories, Microelectronics Center of North Carolina, Symbolics, Agile Systems, and TLW.
He was also at Duke University and the University of North Carolina.

In 1995 he returned to Australia as a professor at Macquarie University.  In 1997 he started Radiata Communications with David Skellern where the first 802.11a chip was designed.  The company was acquired by Cisco Systems in 2001.
After the acquisition, Weste remained with Cisco for 2 years and then founded NHEW R&D, a technology-investment and consulting firm that he continues to manage.

In 2011, Weste joined OzRunways as co-founder. The company developed the first Electronic flight bag application for the Australian market for mobile devices and is used by general aviation pilots, airlines as well as the Australian military.

Weste joined Morse Micro as VP of Engineering in 2016. Based in Sydney, the company is building a new long-range, high-speed, low-energy Wi-Fi, based on 802.11ah chips.

Inventions
Weste has 14 U.S. patents to his name, including a number of methods for doing wireless communication in CMOS integrated circuits.

In 1998, Weste produced a CMOS chipset for the IEEE 802.11a wireless LAN.
He did the conception, managed the project, and participated in the design.

CMOS Textbook

Weste's textbook, Principles of CMOS VLSI Design (initially coauthored with Kamran Eshraghian but now coauthored with David Harris) is a standard textbook in integrated-circuit design courses.
It has been translated into Japanese, Greek, and Chinese.

Other publications

 Weste, N., "MULGA-An Interactive Symbolic Layout System for the Design of Integrated Circuits," in The Bell System Technical Journal, Vol. 60, No. 6, July-Aug. 1981, pp. 823–857.
 Weste, N. and  B.D. Ackland, "The Edge Flag Algorithm - A Fill Method for Raster Scan Displays," IEEE Transactions on Computers, Vol. C-30, No. 1, Jan. 1981, pp. 41–48.
 Weste, N., D.J. Burr, and B.D. Ackland, "Dynamic time warp pattern matching using and integrated multiprocessing array," IEEE Trans. on Computers, Vol. C-32, Aug. 1983, pp. 731–734.
 Weste, N. and J. Mavor, "M.O.S.T. Amplifiers for Performing Peripheral Integrated-Circuit Functions," IEEE Journal on Circuits and Systems, Electronic Circuits and Systems, Vol. 1, No. 5, Sept. 1977, pp. 165–172.
 Weste, N., D.J. Burr, and B.D. Ackland, "Array Configurations for Dynamic Time Warping," IEEE Proc. Acoustics, Speech and Signal Processing, Vol. ASSP-32, No. 1, Feb. 1984, pp. 119–128.
 Weste, N. and P. Kollaritsch, "TOPOLOGIZER: An Expert System Translator of Transistor Connectivity to Symbolic Cell Layout" IEEE JSSC, Vol. SC-20, No. 3, June 1985, pp. 799–804.
 Leonard, J., N. Weste, L. Bodony, S. Harsto,n and R. Meaney, "A 66-MHz DSP-Augmented RAMDAC for Smooth-Shaded Graphic Applications," IEEE JSSC, Vol. 26, No. 3, March 1991, pp. 217–228.
 Edwards, B., A. Corry, N. Weste, and C. Greenberg, "A Single Chip Video Ghost Canceller," IEEE JSSC, Vol. 28, No. 3, March 1993, pp. 379–383.
 Skellern, D.J., L.H.C. Lee, T. McDermott, N.H.E. Weste, J. Dalton, J. Graham, T. Wong, A.F. Myles, T.M.P. Percival, and P.J. Ryan, "A high-speed wireless LAN," IEEE Micro, Vol. 17, Issue 1, Jan.-Feb. 1997, pp. 40–47.
 Weste, N. and D.J. Skellern, "VLSI for OFDM," Communications Magazine, IEEE, Vol. 36, Issue 10, Oct. 1998, pp. 127–131.
 Harrison, J. and N. Weste, "A 500 MHz CMOS anti-alias filter using feed-forward op-amps with local common-mode feedback," Solid-State Circuits Conference, 2003. Digest of Technical Papers. ISSCC. 2003 IEEE International, Vol. 1, 9-13 Feb. 2003, pp. 132–483.
 Harrison, J. and N. Weste, "350 MHz opamp-RC filter in 0.18 um CMOS," Electronics Letters, Vol. 38, Issue 6, 14 March 2002, pp. 259–260.

Miscellaneous
 Weste is an IEEE fellow as well as a fellow in the Australian Academy of Technological Sciences and Engineering (FTSE).
 Weste is the recipient of a 2010 Clunies Ross Medal .
 Weste was married to Avril Weste; they have three daughters, 5 granddaughters, and 2 grandsons.

References 

Living people
1951 births
Academic staff of Macquarie University
University of Adelaide alumni
Duke University faculty
Fellows of the Australian Academy of Technological Sciences and Engineering